The United Bicycle Racers (UBR) (initially and briefly known as World Bike Riders (WBR)) was a short-lived Bicycle Motocross (BMX) racing sanctioning body based in Modesto, California which was started by John Valdez, a bike shop owner, on his 18th birthday that lasted from 1977 to 1983. At its peak it had 34 tracks in California and Nevada. His philosophy was to cater to the local racer and deemphasized the focus on National events. Still, because of its California base, it did attract many of the national caliber pro racers who normally do not attend the events of small sanctioning bodies.

The UBR went out of business due to bankruptcy and ceased operations early in 1983.

Vital statistics

Proficiency and division classes and advancement method

United Bicycle Racers Association list of National number ones

See also
American Bicycle Association
National Bicycle Association
National Bicycle League
National Pedal Sport Association
United States Bicycle Motocross Association

End notes

External links
 The American Bicycle Association
 The National Bicycle League

BMX